Afif Chelbi is a Tunisian politician. He was the Minister of Industry and Technology between 2004 and 2011.

Biography
Afif Chelbi was born on March 14, 1953, in Tunis. He graduated from the École centrale Paris in 1978. He worked for the Tunisian Ministry of Economy and for Tunisian Qatari Bank.

Since 2001, he has been the CEO of the International Maghreb Merchant Bank. In 2004, he was appointed as Minister of Industry, Energy and SMEs.

References

1953 births
Government ministers of Tunisia
École Centrale Paris alumni
Tunisian engineers
Living people
People from Tunis